Galip Ramadhi (born 23 December 1950, in Kavajë) is a politician and former member of the Assembly of the Republic of Albania for the Democratic Party. He served as deputy mayor of Kavajë from 2000 to 2003.

References

Living people
Parliament members from Kavajë
1950 births
Members of the Parliament of Albania
Democratic Party of Albania politicians